Sasha Chanoff is an American humanitarian based in Somerville, Massachusetts who has worked for two decades in refugee rescue, relief, and resettlement operations in Africa and the United States.

Chanoff is the founder and executive director of RefugePoint, a humanitarian organization that works to find lasting solutions for the world's most at-risk refugees and supports the humanitarian community to do the same. RefugePoint works to achieve this mission by transforming the field of refugee resettlement and expanding opportunities for refugees to achieve greater self-reliance in the countries to which they have fled. Prior to launching RefugePoint, Chanoff consulted with the Office of the United Nations High Commissioner for Refugees in Kenya and worked with the International Organization for Migration throughout Africa, identifying refugees in danger, undertaking rescue missions, and working on refugee protection issues with the US, Canadian, Australian, and other governments.

Chanoff often enlists the help of the mass media to spread awareness about refugee issues. He has appeared on 60 Minutes and has been a featured teller on the popular public radio storytelling program The Moth Radio Hour. Chanoff has spoken in other national and international TV, radio, and print media outlets, and has lectured, presented, and given keynote speeches at universities, international conferences, and gala events.

Chanoff holds a B.A. from Wesleyan University and an M.A. in Humanitarian Assistance, from the Tufts University Fletcher School of Law and Diplomacy and Friedman School of Nutrition, Science, and Policy. He has received fellowships from Ashoka, the Draper Richards Kaplan Foundation, and Echoing Green, and is a recipient of the Charles Bronfman Humanitarian Prize and Harvard's Gleitsman International Activist Award. He is a member of the steering committee for New England International Donors, and a human rights adviser to The Leir Charitable Foundations. He also recently served as an adviser to the Warner Bros. film The Good Lie starring Reese Witherspoon, and helped establish its charitable initiative, The Good Lie Fund, which he currently advises.

Chanoff believes resettlement is a vastly superior alternative to refugee camps, since re-settled refugees can support themselves and "get on with their own lives". He views his role as a humanitarian relief organizer to "attempt to help everyone in need."

In 2006, he founded the organization called Mapendo, which was renamed RefugePoint in 2011, to aid at-risk and obscure African refugee groups. Mapendo helped to evacuate more than 10,000 refugees from Sudan, Kenya, Burundi, and the Democratic Republic of Congo. He explained:

Early life
Chanoff was born in Finland. His great grandparents escaped from pogroms in Russia. Many of his relatives were murdered in the Holocaust half a century later. He explained:

He moved to the United States and graduated from Wesleyan University. Chanoff received a bachelor's degree from Wesleyan University, and a master's degree in Humanitarian Assistance through a joint degree program at the Tufts University Fletcher School of Law and Diplomacy and the Friedman School of Nutrition Science and Policy. Chanoff is a dual United States and Finnish citizen and speaks Finnish, German, French, and Swahili.

Awards and honors
Chanoff was awarded the Charles Bronfman Prize for his humanitarian efforts in 2010.
 In 2013, he was awarded the Gleitsman International Activist Award, given to an activist who has "improved the quality of life for others." It is an award given to a leader who works to challenge "injustices around the world and inspires others to do the same." Past recipients of this award have included Ralph Nader and Nelson Mandela. In addition, he received fellowships from Ashoka, the Draper Richards Kaplan Foundation, and Echoing Green. In 2006, he was named a Waldzell Institute "Architect of the Future." He serves on the Steering Committee of New England International Donors.

Books
 From Crisis to Calling, Barrett-Koehler Publishers, 2016

References

Living people
Wesleyan University alumni
American humanitarians
Finnish humanists
People from Somerville, Massachusetts
1975 births
Finnish expatriates in the United States
Ashoka Fellows
Ashoka USA Fellows